Zapallar Casas Viejas Airport is a public airport serving the Pacific coastal town of Zapallar in the Valparaíso Region of Chile.

See also

Transport in Chile
List of airports in Chile

References

External links
OpenStreetMap - Casas Viejas
OurAirports - Casas Viejas
FallingRain - Casas Viejas Airport

Airports in Chile
Airports in Valparaíso Region